Lekianoba was the name given to sporadic forays by Northeast Caucasian people into Georgia from the 16th to the 19th centuries. The term is derived from Leki, by which the Georgians knew the Lezgin people, with the suffix –anoba, which designates attribution. The references to these raids appear in the epic poetry of the Avars; the names of rulers who lead the most devastating attacks, Umma-Khan, Nursal-Bek, and Mallachi, are mentioned in Georgian sources.

The attacks began with the disintegration of the Kingdom of Georgia and the subsequent decline of its successor states in the incessant defence warfare against the Persian and Ottoman Empires. In the late 16th century, part of the Georgian marchlands in the Kingdom of Kakheti, later known as Saingilo, was given by the Persian shah Abbas I to his Dagestani allies, creating a base for subsequent invasions.

Though chiefly of small scale, these assaults were frequent enough to be rather devastating to the fragmentised country, with the marauders taking hostages and pillaging the border settlements. From time to time, these attacks evolved into major military operations involving thousands of troops and conducted by the Dagestani feudal warlords, often in alliance with either the Persians or Ottomans. The Kingdom of Kakheti and Kingdom of Kartli were the two eastern Georgian kingdoms that suffered the most. Often taken by surprise, the Georgians failed to build up an effective defence mechanism against Lekianoba largely due to the permanent internal wars and rivalry among the Georgian polities. Furthermore, Dagestani mercenaries were frequently used by rival Georgian kings and princes against each other.

In the early 1720s, the Georgian king Vakhtang VI intensified his efforts to counter the Dagestani inroads. In 1722, he decided to join his forces with the Russian tsar Peter I and mobilised a large army to campaign against the Dagestanis and their major ally, the Safavid Empire, during the Russo-Persian War (1722-1723). However, Peter soon made peace with the Persians, forcing Vakhtang to recall his troops. Georgia's independence finally collapsed again under the Ottoman and Persian aggression over the two subsequent decades, giving the Dagestani tribesmen more chances to attack. In 1744, Teimuraz II and his son Erekle II revived the kingdoms of Kartli and Kakheti from their overlord, Nader Shah, and joined their forces to check the Dagestani assaults. From 1750 to 1755, they thrice successfully repulsed a large coalition of the Dagestani clans led by the Avar khan Nursal Bek. In 1774, Erekle II created a special military force that initially, under the command of Erekle's son Levan, served as an effective instrument against the Dagestani marauds. However, facing an internal crisis in his kingdom, Erekle was unable to finally eliminate the threats from the Caucasian mountaineers. In 1785 and 1787, the Avar khan Omar twice attacked Kakheti, leaving several border villages in ruins. Beginning in 1801 with the annexation of Georgia by the Russian Empire, the Dagestani inroads weakened significantly. During the Caucasian Wars, Imam Shamil invaded the Kakhetian marches in 1854, an attack largely considered the last incident of Lekianoba.

See also
 Battle of Ghartiskari

References

 Georgian (Soviet) Encyclopedia, vol. 6; Tbilisi, 1983: p. 164 (In Georgian)

Wars involving Georgia (country)
Early Modern history of Georgia (country)
History of Dagestan